was a Japanese daimyō of the Sengoku period, who ruled the Imagawa clan of Suruga Province. 

His childhood name was Ryuomaru (竜王丸). His father was Imagawa Ujichika and his mother was Jukei-ni (d. 1568). He was the brother of Imagawa Yoshimoto.

In ten years his reign, there was no recorded uprising under his rule. He was skilled leader, because his gain the respect, loyalty, and cooperation of Imagawa vassals and retainers. 
Ujiteru paved the foundation for the successful reign of Yoshimoto and Imagawa clan.

1536, he suffered an illness that led to his death and it started a struggle of Imagawa power known as "Hanakura Conflict" between the Imagawa brothers, his elder half-brother, Genkō Etan and his younger brother Yoshimoto. In the end Yoshimoto succeeded to family headship.

Family
Father: Imagawa Ujichika (1473–1526)
Mother: Jukei-ni (d. 1568)
Brothers:
Imagawa Higekoro
Imagawa Yoshimoto
Imagawa Yoshizane
Imagawa Ujitoyo

Daimyo
1513 births
1536 deaths
Imagawa clan